Talang 2018 is the eighth season of the Talang series in Sweden. It will be broadcast on TV4 and premiere on 12 January 2018. Bianca Wahlgren Ingrosso is a new judge after Kakan Hermansson left the series after one season.

Semi-Final 1

Semi-Final 2

Grand Final

References

External links
 TV4 - Talang

Talang (Swedish TV series)
2018 Swedish television seasons